Moon and Sand is a studio album by German jazz pianist Jacky Terrasson and American jazz trumpeter Tom Harrell. The album was recorded in Paris and released in 1991 by Jazz Aux Remparts label. This is a debut full-size release for Terrasson. The album was re-released in 1996 and 2001. The album is a collection of jazz standards with one composition written by Harrell.

Reception
Michel Laverdure of Jazz Magazine stated, "Tom Harrell and Jacky Terrasson in a day of grace!" Le Monde review by Francis Marmande commented, "The music, in short, that I have never stopped loving. Record of the year, certainly, and many years to come. Believe me..."

Track listing

The is also the final title "Well, You Needn't" by Thelonious Monk.

Personnel
Jacky Terrasson – piano 
Tom Harrell – trumpet, flugelhorn

References

1991 albums
Jacky Terrasson albums
Tom Harrell albums
Collaborative albums